Senator Zieman may refer to:

Lyle Zieman (1921–2003), Iowa State Senate
Mark Zieman (born 1945), Iowa State Senate